"Wishing on a Star" is a slow ballad written by former The Undisputed Truth member Billie Rae Calvin and produced by Norman Whitfield. The song was originally offered to Barbra Streisand for her album project but later declined. It was first recorded as a single by Rose Royce in 1977 and has since been recorded by numerous other artists, including The Cover Girls in 1992, Seal in 2011, Jay-Z in 1998 and Beyonce in 2005.

Rose Royce version
Included on their second album, In Full Bloom, "Wishing on a Star" is a slow ballad written by former Undisputed Truth member Billie Rae Calvin and produced by Norman Whitfield. It was sung by Gwen Dickey under her stage name. The lyrics concern a woman longing for the return of an ex-lover so that they can resume their relationship. The original version of "Wishing on a Star" peaked at number 52 on the Billboard R&B singles chart.

Charts

Fresh 4 version
British DJ and production group, Fresh 4, released their cover in September 1989. It was produced by Smith & Mighty and featured Lizz E, and became the group's only notable UK hit, peaking at number 10 on the UK Singles Chart.

Charts

The Cover Girls version

The Cover Girls recorded a cover of the song in 1992 for their third album Here It Is. It was the first single featuring new lead singer Michelle Valentine. The group's version peaked at number nine on the Billboard Hot 100 chart and became the 49th biggest single of 1992 in America. While the group had had success in America up to that point, the single was their first single to become a hit when it was released in Europe, peaking at number 6 in the Netherlands and number 38 in the UK.

In Brazil, this version gained popularity after being included in the soap opera De Corpo e Alma soundtrack, being the theme of the character Yasmin Bianchi, who was played by deceased actress Daniella Perez.

The Cover Girls also recorded a Spanish version of the song.

Formats and track listings

CD
 "Wishing On A Star (Radio Edit)"
 "Wishing On A Star (Spanish Version)"

CD MAXI
 "Wishing On A Star (7" Version)"
 "Wishing On A Star (12" Mix)"
 "Wishing On A Star (Magic Sessions Dub 1)"
 "Wishing On A Star (Magic Sessions Vocal Dub)"
 "Wishing On A Star (Jeep 12")"

Vinyl
A-Side
 "Wishing On A Star (12" Mix)"
 "Wishing On A Star (Jeep 12")"
 "Wishing On A Star (Magic Sessions Dub 1)"

B-Side
 "Wishing On A Star (TNT Dub)"
 "Wishing On A Star (Amigo Dub)"
 "Wishing On A Star (Acapella)"

Charts

Weekly charts

Year-end charts

Randy Crawford version

Randy Crawford recorded a cover of the song for her 1998 album Every Kind of Mood: Randy, Randi, Randee. The song was produced by Mousse T., and released as the third single off the album in September 1998.

Charts

Jay-Z version

American rapper Jay-Z covered Wishing on a Star, featuring Gwen Dickey of Rose Royce, in 1998. It is featured on the United Kingdom release of In My Lifetime, Vol. 1 and Greatest Hits. The D'Influence remix can be found on Chapter One: Greatest Hits and Bring It On: The Best of Jay Z.

A music video for the song was also released, showing a child actor David Sincere Aiken portraying Jay-Z growing up in Marcy Houses. Jay-Z himself does not appear in the video played by celebrity choreographer David Sincere Aiken .

Track listings

CD
 "Wishing on a Star (Radio Edit)"
 "Wishing on a Star (Trackmasters Remix)"
 "Wishing on a Star (D Influence Remix)"
 "Brooklyn's Finest"
 "Wishing on a Star (Trackmasters Acappella)"

Vinyl
A-Side
 "Wishing on a Star (D Influence Remix)"
 "Wishing on a Star (Radio Edit)"

B-Side
 "Wishing on a Star (Trackmasters Remix)"
 "Imaginary Players"
 "Wishing on a Star (Trackmasters Acappella)"

Charts

Beyoncé version

"Wishing on a Star" was covered by American singer Beyoncé for the CD part of her live album Live at Wembley (2004). A writer for AllMusic described Beyoncé's cover as "sexy". The cover was also used to promote the fragrance True Star endorsed by American fashion designer Tommy Hilfiger in 2004. An a cappella version of the song was recorded by Beyoncé for its television campaign. An extended play (EP), titled True Star: A Private Performance and composed of two songs–"Wishing on a Star" and "Naïve", was released to promote the fragrance. Produced by Beyoncé and Hilfiger, it was solely available with limited edition purchases of True Star.

In 2005, "Wishing on a Star" was included on the soundtrack of the film Roll Bounce. It was later released for radio airplay as one of three singles from the soundtrack, becoming the second most-added single on urban adult contemporary radio following its release. The song peaked at number 28 on the US Adult R&B Songs chart. At the 48th Annual Grammy Awards (2006), the cover was nominated for Best Female R&B Vocal Performance. Six years after its original release, the song was made available for digital download on August 17, 2010.

Formats and track listings
True Star: A Private Performance
"Wishing on a Star" – 4:07
"Naïve" – 3:45

Digital download
"Wishing on a Star" – 4:08

Charts

Seal version

In 2011, "Wishing on a Star" was covered by Nigerian-British singer Seal. It was released as the first UK single taken from his album Soul 2 on November 20, 2011. This interpretation of "Wishing on a Star" was produced by previous collaborator, Trevor Horn.

Seal's version of the song was premiered on Ken Bruce's BBC Radio 2 show on October 13, 2011. The single later peaked on the Radio 2 B-list.

Critical reception
In her review for Soul 2, Caroline Sullivan of The Guardian expressed, "His voice and interpretive skills are such, though, that most tracks fit him like a glove, to the point where, on Rose Royce's Wishing on a Star, his oak-aged vocal seems a better fit for the remorseful lyric than original singer Gwen Dickey's. He grew up with these 1970s hits, and evidently reveres them, but isn't cowed by them". In his review, Mike Diver of the BBC expressed that "Seal has a voice that can melt icecaps has never been doubted by his detractors – the problems with his material post-Seal (II) went deeper, to a basic songwriting level. Here, freed of the weight of his own emotions, he soars on a sublime Wishing on a Star (which manages to borrow its smoky backing from Sade's Smooth Operator).

Live performances
Seal performed "Wishing on a Star" on Daybreak on November 25, 2011.

Formats and track listings
Digital download

"Wishing on a Star" – 4:13

The X Factor UK 2011 contestants version

Wishing on a Star was covered by the contestants of the eighth series of The X Factor, also featuring previous boyband contestants JLS and One Direction. The cover was released on November 27, 2011, via digital download, and released as a physical single the following day. All proceeds from the single went to the children's charity organization Together for Short Lives. The song debuted at number one on the UK Singles Chart with first-week sales of 98,932 copies.

Track listing
 "Wishing on a Star" – 3:23
 "Wishing on a Star (Instrumental)" – 3:23

Charts

Year-end charts

Release history

Other cover versions
88.3 ft. Lisa May in 1995, No. 61 UK hit
Billie Rae Calvin, who wrote the song, recorded a solo version for Ian Levine's Motorcity Records.
The song was covered by Anne Dudley as the theme song for the miniseries The 10th Kingdom in 2000.
In 2000, Luka Bloom published an acoustic version of the song on the album Keeper of the Flame
In 2004, Paul Weller's version rose to number 11 on the UK charts.
In 2005, shadow musician, Catman Cohen, recorded the first male-female duet of the song.
In 2018, Tom Grennan released a 'BBC Live Version' as a non-album single.

See also
List of songs recorded by Jay-Z

References 

1970s ballads
1977 songs
1978 singles
1989 singles
1992 singles
1998 singles
2004 singles
2010 singles
2011 singles
Soul ballads
Rose Royce songs
The Cover Girls songs
Jay-Z songs
Beyoncé songs
Seal (musician) songs
JLS songs
One Direction songs
The X Factor (British TV series)
Song recordings produced by Norman Whitfield
Song recordings produced by Trevor Horn
Song recordings produced by Trackmasters
Syco Music singles
Reprise Records singles
Warner Records singles
Warner Music Group singles
Epic Records singles
Roc-A-Fella Records singles
Def Jam Recordings singles
Sony Music UK singles
Whitfield Records singles
Fresh 4 songs
Number-one singles in Scotland
UK Singles Chart number-one singles